William Franks  (23 July 1820 – 8 February 1879) was an English first-class cricketer and barrister.

Franks was born at Hatfield in July 1820. He was educated at Harrow School, before going up to Trinity College, Cambridge. A student of the Inner Temple, he was called to the bar in 1846. Franks played first-class cricket for the Marylebone Cricket Club from 1845 to 1848, making seven appearances. He had little success in his seven matches, scoring 44 runs with a highest score of 16. Franks twice served the Marquess of Salisbury as his official private secretary at Hatfield House, in 1852 and 1858–9. He also served as both a deputy lieutenant and justice of the peace for Hertfordshire, in addition to being a captain in the Hertfordshire Militia. Franks died at St Leonards-on-Sea in February 1879, after suffering from a long illness.

References

External links

1820 births
1879 deaths
People from Hatfield, Hertfordshire
People educated at Harrow School
Alumni of Trinity College, Cambridge
Bedfordshire and Hertfordshire Regiment officers
Members of the Inner Temple
English cricketers
Marylebone Cricket Club cricketers
Deputy Lieutenants of Hertfordshire
English justices of the peace
People from Hastings
Military personnel from Hertfordshire